Anika Reddy Kolan (born 18 August 2006) is an American cricketer who plays for the United States women's national cricket team. 

In October 2021, Kolan was named in the American Women's Twenty20 International (WT20I) team for the 2021 ICC Women's T20 World Cup Americas Qualifier tournament in Mexico. She made her WT20I debut on 18 October 2021, in the opening match of the tournament against Brazil. The following month, she was also named in America's squad for the 2021 Women's Cricket World Cup Qualifier tournament in Harare, Zimbabwe. On 25 November 2021, she played in America's second match of the tournament, against Zimbabwe.

References

External links

2006 births
Living people
People from Tracy, California
American women cricketers
United States women Twenty20 International cricketers
Cricketers from California
American people of Telugu descent
American sportspeople of Indian descent